Anusha Rizvi (born 13 March 1978) is an Indian film director and screenwriter.
Formerly a journalist, Anusha's directorial debut, Peepli Live, premiered at the Sundance Film Festival 2010 in the World Competition Section. It was the first Indian film to be accepted in the 25 years of the festival’s existence. The film also won the Best First Film Award at the Durban film festival and the Gollapudi Srinivas Award.

The film was later nominated as India's official entry to the 83rd Academy awards. She also directed a National Geographic documentary Hijack IC-814 and two BBC documentaries Amul and Khadi.  Anusha is currently developing a series for leading Indian platform, Hotstar.

Career
Anusha Rizvi was a journalist before venturing into film direction. She graduated in history from St. Stephen's College, University of Delhi. She approached Aamir Khan to make the film who finally did support her with "Peepli Live".

Personal life

Anusha is married to noted writer and film director Mahmood Farooqui.

Filmography
 Peepli Live - Director and writer

References

External links
 

Living people
Indian Shia Muslims
Film directors from Delhi
Hindi-language film directors
1978 births
Indian women film directors
21st-century Indian film directors
Women artists from Delhi